Audio Eagle is a recording studio opened in 2001 by musician Patrick Carney. The studio was located in Akron, Ohio and consisted mostly of a digital 12-track recorder. It went through many incarnations and configurations and was mainly used to record the first four The Black Keys albums. In 2010, the studio was relocated to Nashville, Tennessee.

The recording studio is used solely for Carney's productions.

Artists who have recorded at Audio Eagle Studio include Michelle Branch, Calvin Johnson, Tennis, The Sheepdogs, Jessy Wilson, and *repeat repeat.

American independent record labels